Vivekananda Satavarshiki Mahavidyalaya, also known as Manikpara College, established in 1964, is a college in Manikpara, in  Jhargram District. It offers undergraduate courses both honours and general courses in arts, commerce and sciences. It is affiliated to  Vidyasagar University. The college is accredited by National Assessment and Accreditation Council (NAAC) in 2015.

Departments 

The institute has the following departments:

 Science
Chemistry
Physics
Mathematics
Geography
Economics

Arts and Commerce
Bengali
English
Sanskrit
Santali
History
Political Science
Philosophy
Physical Education
Commerce

Accreditation 
The college is recognized by the University Grants Commission (UGC). The college is also accredited by NAAC in 2015.

See also

References

External links 
Vivekananda Satavarshiki Mahavidyalaya

Universities and colleges in Jhargram district
Colleges affiliated to Vidyasagar University
Educational institutions established in 1964
1964 establishments in West Bengal